Jakarat Tonhongsa (born 29 September 1973) is a Thai retired football defender who played for Thailand in the 1996 Asian Cup He is the current head coach Thai League 3 club of Mahasarakham.

External links
 
 11v11.com

1973 births
Living people
Jakarat Tonhongsa
Place of birth missing (living people)
Jakarat Tonhongsa
Southeast Asian Games medalists in football
Association football defenders
Competitors at the 1995 Southeast Asian Games
Jakarat Tonhongsa
Jakarat Tonhongsa
Jakarat Tonhongsa